The Burs (Latin Buri, Buredeense and Buridavenses; Greek Βοῦροι) were a Dacian tribe living in Dacia in the 1st and 2nd centuries A.D., with their capital city at Buridava.

Name
According to Wilhelm Tomaschek, the root bur- is well known with the Dacian Thracian names: i.e. Burus (Thrax), Bουρχέντιος (that is to say Bhūri–Kanta, a Bessian from Thrace), Burebista (the king of Dacians that is maybe related to Sanskrit bhūri "abundant, rich" and Iranian vista "possessor" ).

Historical evidence 
The Dacian tribe Buredeense / Buri is attested by the ninth tabula of Europe of Ptolemy's Geography, Cassius Dio and inscriptions.

Before the battle of Tapae (101) (in the first campaign of Trajan) the Dacian tribe, the Buri, sent Trajan a message to the effect that he should withdraw from Dacia and restore peaceful relations. Their message to him was inscribed on the smooth top of a very large mushroom, in Latin. This message was unusual enough to become part of a frieze on Trajan's Column.

In the 6th century a deed issued by Justinian, dated 530 AD, mentions the Burs:

"Insuper constituimus, tibique damus hic descripta armorum insignia: videlicet: scutum in septem partes divisum; in medio eius, scutum aureum, cui inest aquila dupplex, alba et nigra, quae significat Emblema Imperiale, cuius capita coronata sunt purpureo Imperiali diademate, ex parte dextra in prima divisione scutum rubrum, in cuius medio videtur turris, significans utramque Daciam, in secunda divisione scutum coeleste, cum tribus Burris, quarum duae e lateribus albae sunt, media vero aurea, quae indicat Albaniam superiorem; in tertia sectione scutum album cum uno Leone, indicante Epyrum; ex parte vero sinistra in sectione scutum coelestis coloris cum dupplici cruce aurea, exprimente secundam Pannoniam; in secunda divisione scutum rubrum, in cuius medio est caper nigri coloris, significans Macedoniam: et in tertia sectione scutum viridis coloris, et in eo duo brachia vestita, stemma aureum septem margaritis gemmatum tenentia, quae indicant Thessaliam: duo quoque emicant astra aurea, unum in media superioris scuti parte, et alterum in inferiori, quae complementum symbolicum ceterarum terrarum, et provinciarum terminant. Super dictis emblematibus apparet crux erecta triformis, significans dignitatem summi sacerdotii, corona Ducali tecta; in dextra eius parte gladius aureus absolutam in temporali authoritatem indicans: e sinistra vero pedum Pastorale, dictans authoritatem in spirituali, quae omnia cooperiuntur Pileo rubro, longo funicolo cum longis nodis et aureis fimbriis circumplexo, quo caput tuum adornabis comparens in omnibus publicis functionibus."

Identity and distribution 

According to Shchukin (1989), Bichir (1976) the tribal union of Buri were part of the Dacian state of Burebista, besides the Daci, the Getae, and the Carpi.

They allied  with other tribes in the region to support the efforts by Decebal, the Dacian king, to turn back the Romans. There were two Dacian tribes Buri: one in the later Roman Dacia centered on Buridava and other located to the North West of Dacia (South of Slovakian Carpathians) in the Upper Basin of Tisza. (Note: the Germanic Buri were between the Oder and the Vistula, between Cracow and Troppau, in Silesia. They were allies of Trajan, Roman Emperor, in his war against the Dacians, and also of Marcus Aurelius in the Marcomannic Wars.)

The socio-political formation of the Dacians Buri / Buridavensi that was centered on Buridava was located to the North East of Oltenia and Muntenia (modern Vâlcea and Argeş counties) and also on the other side of the Carpathians, in the regions of Sebeş and Făgăraş mountains. This tribal union is documented by the archaeological monetary findings Aninoasa Dobresti. Among other evidences, a fragment of a vase carrying the inscription BUR, discovered at Ocnița, Muntenia, Romania, indicates the name of the tribe or union of tribes, the Buridavensi Dacians.

The Buri of the Upper Basin of Tisza is a part of the Buridavensi that migrated towards North West, where they neighbored the Germanic Quadi. At the new location, ancient sources also list other Dacian tribes: Piegetae, Biessi, Carpians, Arsitae, and Racatae.

The material culture of a mixed Dacian-Germanic origin, known in Slovakia ever since the beginning of the first century AD (at Zemplin, for instance), could represent the population named Buri in historical sources.

Notes

See also
 List of Dacian tribes
 Buridava
 Burebista

References

External links
The conquest of the Dacia

Trajan's Dacian Wars
Ancient tribes in Dacia
Dacian tribes